Greek foot may refer to

 Ancient Greek foot (poûs), the ancient Greek unit of length
 A foot, especially in statuary, having a second toe longer than the hallux, as in Morton's toe